was a Japanese politician who served two terms as foreign minister and as labour minister.

Early life and education
Hailing from Nagano Prefecture, Kosaka was born into a politician family on 23 January 1912. His grandfather, Zennosuke Kosaka, was the founder of the daily Shinano Mainichi and a politician. His father, Junzo Kosaka, was also a politician. His younger brother, Tokusaburo Kosaka, was a leading politician of the Liberal Democratic Party. Zentaro Kosaka was a graduate of Tokyo University of Commerce (present-day Hitotsubashi University).

Career
After graduation, Kosaka began his career at the Mitsubishi Bank. Then he worked for Shin-Etsu Chemical which was established by his father, Junzo Kosaka. Later he joined the Liberal Democratic Party. He was part of the Kōchikai faction headed by Hayato Ikeda.

Kosaka first became a member of the House of Representatives in 1946, being a representative for the Nagano Prefecture. He served at the lower house 16 times and held different ministerial post. On 6 September 1960, Kosaka visited Seoul, being the first Japanese official to visit South Korea since 1945. He was appointed labour minister in the Yoshida Cabinet, foreign minister in the cabinets of Hayato Ikeda and Takeo Miki.

Kosaka's first term as foreign minister was from 19 July 1960 to 18 July 1962. Assuming the post shortly after the massive Anpo Protests against the US-Japan Security Treaty, Kosaka's most pressing task was to restore good relations with the United States. Kosaka recalled, "In the immediate aftermath of the Security Treaty riots, repairing US-Japan relations was our single biggest concern." To this end, Kosaka visited the United States several times and helped arrange a summit meeting between Prime Minister Ikeda and President John F. Kennedy in Washington D.C. in June 1961.

In August 1966, Kosaka and Yoshimi Furui headed an eight-member LDP delegation to visit China. They both held the views of right-conservatism, arguing for Japan's independence from the US and normalized relations with China. After the visit, Kosaka developed a policy report, called the Kosaka Report, which was submitted to the LDP's policy affairs research council.

In 1968, Kosaka stated his desire to visit Mongolia to search for the viability of economic assistance towards the country. In 1970, Kosaka argued that Japan should declare a "no-war" notice in order to reduce tensions between Japan and China. He was also the head of political affairs research committee in the LDP during the same period. He also served as the head of economic planning agency during the term of the then Prime Minister Kakuei Tanaka. On 24 July 1972, Tanaka also appointed him as chairman of the newly founded Council for the normalization of Japan-China relations in the LDP. The task of the council that consisted of 312 members was to reach a consensus, since the pro-Taiwan and pro-Peking factions over the whole peace treaty issue emerged in the party. IN September 1972, Kosaka visited Pekin as special envoy of the prime minister Tanaka. Then Kosaka served as deputy prime minister and visited Libya in January 1974.

Kosaka was secondly appointed foreign minister in 1976. In 1976, he called for a reform of the UN security council at the UN general assembly. At the beginning of the 1980s, he served as the chairman of the LDP's foreign affairs research council. Kosaka retired from politics in 1990.

Personal life and legacy
Kosaka's son, Kenji Kosaka, is a LDP politician and former minister of education. Kosaka participated his son's election campaign for the lower house in the Nagano district in 1990.

The Chinese restaurant of Okura Hotel in Tokyo was named by Kosaka.

Death
Kosaka died of renal failure in Tokyo on 26 November 2000. He was 88.

References

External links

|-

|-

|-

|-

|-

20th-century Japanese politicians
1912 births
2000 deaths
Deaths from kidney failure
Foreign ministers of Japan
Government ministers of Japan
Hitotsubashi University alumni
Liberal Democratic Party (Japan) politicians
Members of the House of Representatives (Japan)
People from Nagano Prefecture
Politicians from Nagano Prefecture